The Democratic Reforms Party is an Azerbaijani political party established on May 27, 2005.

The party's first congress took place on July 4, 2005, where the party's program and memorandum were accepted, members of its Political Council and General Revision Committee were elected. Party's congress also elected Asim Mollazade, a member of the Parliament of Azerbaijan, as the party's first chairman. The following people became members of its Political Council:

 Asim Mollazade
 Rauf Talyshinsky
 Ingilab Ahmedov
 Nazim Abdullayev
 Eduard Chernin
 Elkhan Agamirzayev
 Gulnara Mamedova
 Murad Rahimov
 Mardan Afandiyev
 Eldar Jahangirov
 Ilgar Huseynov

The members of the Central Revision Committee:

 Chingiz Abdullayev
 Roman Temnikov
 Ilkin Hasanov

At the initiative of Asim Mollazade, the Chief Editor of popular "Echo" Newspaper, Rauf Talyshinsky, was appointed as Deputy Chairman for Political matters, Ingilab Ahmedov - Deputy Chairman for Economic matters, and Nazim Abdullayev, president of "NNN" Group of Companies, - Deputy Chairman for Entrepreneurship.

External links
The official website of PDR

2005 establishments in Azerbaijan
Political parties established in 2005
Political parties in Azerbaijan
Azerbaijani democracy movements